Metalimnus is a genus of true bugs belonging to the family Cicadellidae.

The species of this genus are found in Europe and Japan.

Species:
 Metalimnus formosus Boheman, 1845 
 Metalimnus marmorata Flor, 1861

References

Cicadellidae
Hemiptera genera